Zang Di 臧棣 (born 1964) is a noted Chinese poet, critic, translator and editor from Beijing. He is considered a "leading poet-critic of his generation." His work as an anthologist also is well-known.

Career
Zang Di graduated Peking University with a Ph.D. in Chinese literature in 1997. He currently works as an associate professor at Peking University.

Awards
 Contemporary China’s Top Ten Prominent Young Poets Award (2005)
 China’s Top Ten Rising Poetry Critics Award (2007)
 Chinese Poetry Biennial Top Ten Poets Award (2008)
 The Poet of the Year Award (2008)

References

Chinese poets
1964 births
Living people
Date of birth missing (living people)
Peking University alumni
Academic staff of Peking University